Colorpoint Shorthairs are a variety of domestic cats. Depending on the cat registry, they may be considered a separate breed of cat, or more often a variant of a pre-existing one, if accepted at all. These cats are distinguished by their conformance to wide range of sixteen different point colors, beyond the four standard Siamese colors. The variety was initially created by crossbreeding Siamese with the American Shorthair – the same mixture that created the Oriental Shorthair, but with different goals.  The Colorpoint Shorthair shares the point-coloration pattern with the Siamese, but in the nontraditional colors of red, cream, tortoiseshell, and lynx (tabby) points, and minor variations thereof. In body style, head shape, and other features, it may be intermediate between the two foundation breeds, which show cats leaning toward Siamese traits. Those who favour the Traditional Siamese look may also favour the more moderate-typed Colorpoint Shorthairs that take after their American Shorthair ancestors in shape. 

The Cat Fanciers' Association (CFA) and the World Cat Federation (WCF) are the only major registries that recognize them as a standalone breed. In other registries, they are part of the Siamese or Oriental Shorthair breeds (and may not be accepted as show and breeding quality, depending on what colors the registry permits in these breeds, and whether they permit any outbreeding in the lineage). Because these cats are a crossbreed, various registries are resistant to accepting either as breeds, or as valid Siamese.

Description
"Colorpoint Shorthair" is the name the Cat Fanciers' Association (CFA), a United States breed association, uses to refer to pointed cats of Siamese ancestry and type in colors other than the four "traditional" Siamese colors (seal, chocolate, blue, and lilac point). This name is also given to cats of Siamese ancestry in the four recognized colors whose eight generation pedigree show ancestors with other colors. In registries of other countries, however, "Colorpoint" (or "Colourpoint") is the name given to cats of Persian type and pointed coloring, as in Himalayans.

In the CFA, a Colorpoint Shorthair cat may also be any of the four traditional Siamese colors; however, they may only be shown in the red point (also called flame point, in the Persian Family) or cream point, or any of the above colors in tabby point (also called lynx point) or tortoiseshell point.

In most registries besides CFA, the Colorpoint Shorthair is not considered a separate breed but merely a color class in the Siamese breed.

Origin
The effort to produce a Siamese-style pointed cat in colors other than the traditional four began in England and in America in the 1940s, carried out by breeders who used foundation crossings between the Siamese, Abyssinian, and the red domestic shorthair. The American Shorthair also became part of the matrix. Initially, the Colorpoint breeders experienced setbacks and failures; in the effort to achieve the proper colors in the proper places, the Siamese body type was often sacrificed. The breeding was further complicated by the difficulty of working with the red coloration because it is a sex-linked color.

Temperament
The Colorpoint Shorthair is a highly intelligent, playful, and people-friendly breed.  They are extremely affectionate and outgoing and enjoy lounging around and playing with people, causing them to also be described as "extroverts". They can also be very sensitive with nervous temperaments, which do not adapt well to changes of environment or to strangers. Like Siamese, they can be extremely vocal and attention-demanding, feeling a need for human companionship. They have over 100 vocal sounds, much more than other breeds, making for very unusual meows.
Males are sometimes found to be overly aggressive towards other animals and will fight with other cats whenever they feel their territory has been invaded or just to express dominance.

Point colors
The Colorpoint Shorthair comes in a variety of point colors.  They include: Red Point (also called Flame Point), Cream Point, Cinnamon Point, Fawn Point, Seal Point, Chocolate Point, Blue Point, Lilac Point, Lynx Point (in any of the colors), Tortie Point (in any of the colors), and Torbie Point (in any of the colors). If a solid pointed kitten is born from "Colorpoint Siamese" parents, it is Registered as a "Colorpoint Siamese," because it is still genetically a Colorpoint.

CFA and CCA do not accept cinnamon points or fawn points as Colorpoint Shorthairs; they are considered to be pointed Oriental Shorthairs. CFA does not allow the cinnamon and fawn points to show. However, they are acceptable in a breeding program. CCA does allow cinnamon and fawn points to be shown as Oriental Shorthairs.

See also
Cat coat genetics
Tabby cat
Bicolor cat

References

External links

Cat breeds
Cat breeds originating in the United States